Vevatne is a Norwegian surname. Notable people with the surname include:

Jan M. Vevatne (born 1950), Norwegian politician
Viljar Vevatne (born 1994), Norwegian footballer

Norwegian-language surnames